Ziad Nasreddine is a Canadian neurologist notable for creating the Montreal Cognitive Assessment (MoCA).

Biography 
He is a Lebanese immigrant to Canada, graduated from the University of Sherbrooke, Québec, and then completed a fellowship in Cognitive Neurology/Neurobehavior at UCLA. In 1992, during his residency program, Dr Nasreddine perceived the need for a more comprehensive cognitive screening adapted for clinicians, and thus developed his first comprehensive cognitive screening test. In 1996, after his fellowship, he decided to adapt his comprehensive screen and create a much quicker comprehensive assessment that is adapted to first line specialty clinics with high volume of patients.

References 

Canadian neurologists
University of California, Los Angeles staff
Living people
Year of birth missing (living people)
Lebanese emigrants to Canada